Chameliya Khola Hydropower Station (चमेलिया खोला जलविद्युत आयोजना) is a run-of-river hydro-electric plant located in Sikhar, Darchula District of Nepal. The flow from the Chamelia River is used to generate 30 MW electricity.  The plant is owned and operated by Nepal Electricity Authority. The plant started generating electricity from 2074-10-27 BS. The power station is connected to the national grid.

Finance
The project is jointly funded by Government of Nepal and Republic of Korea through Economic Development Corporation Fund.  It took 10 years to construct the project.

See also
List of power stations in Nepal

References

External links
Nepal Electricity Authority

Hydroelectric power stations in Nepal
Gravity dams
Run-of-the-river power stations
Dams in Nepal
Buildings and structures in Darchula District